Nerik (Hittite: Nerik(ka)) was a Bronze Age settlement to the north of the Hittite capitals Hattusa and Sapinuwa, probably in the Pontic region.

History
It was occupied in the Middle Bronze and Late Bronze. The Hittites held it as sacred to a Storm-god who was the son of Wurušemu, Sun-goddess of Arinna. The weather god is associated or identified with Mount Zaliyanu near Nerik, responsible for bestowing rain on the city.

Nerik was founded by Hattic language speakers as Narak; in the Hattusa archive, tablet CTH 737 records a Hattic incantation for a festival there. Under Hattusili I, the Nesite-speaking Hittites took over Nerik. They maintained a spring festival called "Puruli" in honor of the Storm-god of Nerik. In it, the celebrants recited the myth of the slaying of Illuyanka.

Under Hantili, Nerik was ruined and the Hittites had to relocate the Puruli festival to Hattusa. As of the reign of Tudhaliya I, Nerik's site was occupied by the barbarian Kaskas, whom the Hittites blamed for its initial destruction.

During Muwatalli II's reign, his brother and appointed governor Hattusili III recaptured Nerik and rebuilt it as its High Priest. Hattusili named his firstborn son "Nerikkaili" in commemoration (although he later passed him over for the succession). Seven years after Muwatalli's son Mursili III became king, Mursili reassigned Nerik to another governor. Hattusili rebelled and became king himself.

Nerik disappeared from the historical record when the Hittite kingdom fell, ca. 1200 BC.

Excavations
In 2005, Rainer Maria Czichon and Jörg Klinger of the Free University of Berlin began excavating Oymaağaç Höyük. Thus far, this is the northernmost place of Anatolia with remains from the Hittite Empire, including "three fragments of tablets and a bulla with stamps of the scribe Sarini. In addition, mention of the mountains, in which Nerik was located, have been found at the site, as well as features suggestive of monumental Hittite architecture."  The team has published a number of articles related to their excavations.

According to Czichon, who is currently in the archaeology faculty at Uşak University, many stone and loom artifacts were unearthed during the excavations. Mining tools were found for copper deposits situated at nearby Tavşan Mountain field. The most valuable artifacts are tablets with cuneiform script, which point out the site as Nerik. An inventory list showing tools, including silver trays and golden bullae contained in an unknown shrine, is also among the findings.

References

External links
Prayer for Nerik
Apology of Hattusili III
 Archaeological research in connection with Nerik
Oymaağaç Höyük (Samsun)

Hattian cities
Hittite sites in Turkey
Hittite cities
Former populated places in Turkey
Archaeological sites in the Black Sea Region
Vezirköprü